Phillipsburg High School may refer to one of several high schools in the United States:

Phillipsburg High School (Kansas)  — Phillipsburg, Kansas
Phillipsburg High School (New Jersey) — Phillipsburg, New Jersey
Phillipsburg Alternative Secondary High School — Phillipsburg, New Jersey